Tirtha Gautam is a Nepalese politician, belonging to the Nepal Communist Party currently serving as the member of the 1st Federal Parliament of Nepal. In the 2017 Nepalese general election she was elected as a proportional representative from Khas Arya category. She came into politics after her husband Yadu was killed by the Maoists in 1999.

References

Nepal MPs 2017–2022
Living people
Communist Party of Nepal (Unified Marxist–Leninist) politicians
Nepal MPs 1999–2002
1963 births